Clanculus laurae is a species of sea snail, a marine gastropod mollusk in the family Trochidae, the top snails.

Description

Distribution
This species occurs in the Mediterranean Sea off Tunisia.

References

laurae
Gastropods described in 2008